"Zeit" is a song by German Neue Deutsche Härte band Rammstein. It is the title track from their eighth studio album of the same name and released as the first single from it. The song became Rammstein's third No. 1 single in Germany after "Deutschland" in 2019. The track was also nominated for the 2022 Kerrang! Award for Best Single.

Music video
The band began posting a video teaser trailer on 8 March on their website and social media platform. The song's music video was released on 10 March 2022 at 17:00 CET. It was directed by actor and musician Robert Gwisdek.

Track listing

Charts

Weekly charts

Year-end charts

References

External links
 

2022 singles
German-language songs
Number-one singles in Germany
Rammstein songs
Songs written by Till Lindemann
Songs written by Paul Landers
Songs written by Richard Z. Kruspe
Songs written by Christian Lorenz
Songs written by Oliver Riedel
Songs written by Christoph Schneider
Universal Music Group singles